The Chenyoulan River or Chenyulan River is a river in Nantou County, Taiwan. It is a tributary of the Zhuoshui River. Villages in the water shed include Dongpu and Fengqui.  Its tributary streams are Junkeng, Shibachong, Shalixian, Heshe and Neimaopu Streams. The catchment area is 450 m2 and its length is 42.4 km.  The average slope is 5%.  The upper reaches drain the north slopes of Yushan up to 3910 metres elevation. The path of the river has been set by the Chenyulan fault.

References

Rivers of Taiwan
Landforms of Nantou County